Salt Springs Township is an inactive township in Randolph County, in the U.S. state of Missouri.

Salt Springs Township was so named on account of brine springs in the area.

References

Townships in Missouri
Townships in Randolph County, Missouri